Dušan Brković (Serbian Cyrillic: Душан Брковић; born 20 January 1989) is a Serbian professional footballer who plays as a defender for Icelandic club KA Akureyri.

Club career
Born in Titovo Užice, Brković came through the youth system at Partizan, but never made it into the senior squad. He was instead loaned to affiliated club Teleoptik in order to gain experience. Before moving abroad, Brković made his Serbian SuperLiga debuts with Hajduk Kula and Smederevo.

In the summer of 2012, Brković signed for Israeli club Hapoel Haifa. He spent one year there, winning the Toto Cup, before moving to Hungarian side Debrecen. In his debut season at the club, Brković helped them win the league title.

After a brief spell at Latvian club Riga, Brković returned to Hungary and joined Diósgyőr in the 2018 winter transfer window. On June 23 2020, after a 4—0 defeat against his former team Debrecen, it was announced that his contract (that would expire on June 30th) will not be renewed.

International career
Brković represented Serbia and Montenegro at the 2006 UEFA Under-17 Championship. His only appearance for the Serbia U21s came in a 0–3 friendly loss away to Romania U21 on 26 May 2010.

Honours
Hapoel Haifa
 Toto Cup: 2012–13
Debrecen
 Nemzeti Bajnokság I: 2013–14
 Ligakupa: Runner-up 2014–15
 Szuperkupa: Runner-up 2013, 2014

Notes

References

External links
 
 
 

Association football defenders
Debreceni VSC players
Diósgyőri VTK players
Expatriate footballers in Hungary
Expatriate footballers in Israel
Expatriate footballers in Latvia
FK Hajduk Kula players
FK Partizan players
FK Smederevo players
FK Teleoptik players
Hapoel Haifa F.C. players
Israeli Premier League players
Latvian Higher League players
Nemzeti Bajnokság I players
Riga FC players
Knattspyrnufélag Akureyrar players
Serbia and Montenegro footballers
Serbia under-21 international footballers
Serbia youth international footballers
Serbian expatriate footballers
Serbian expatriate sportspeople in Hungary
Serbian expatriate sportspeople in Israel
Serbian expatriate sportspeople in Latvia
Serbian First League players
Serbian footballers
Serbian SuperLiga players
Sportspeople from Užice
1989 births
Living people